Ankit Khatana is an Indian amateur boxer. He won the bronze medal at the 2018 Youth World Championships held in Hungary. He has been a National Champion, 2019 and was a gold medalist at the 2019 South Asian Games. In International tournaments he won the bronze at the 36th Feliks Stamm International Tournament, Poland.

Early life 
Ankit Khatana was born on 9 September 1998 in Abheypur village in Gurugram, Haryana to Sanjay Kumar, a farmer and Balesh, a homemaker.

Career 
Khatana started his boxing career by participating in 28th Sub Junior Men State Boxing Championship in 2013 and won the bronze medal in the 41st Junior Men Haryana State Boxing Championship 2015–16. Next he won the gold medal in the South Asian Games held in Kathmandu, Nepal. He next won the silver medal in the AIBA Youth World Boxing Championships 2018. In 2019, Khatana then participated in the 4th Elite men's national boxing championship held in Himachal Pradesh where he bagged a gold medal.

References 

Living people
1998 births
Indian male boxers
Lightweight boxers
Boxers from Haryana